Henry Allen Gray (13 July 1873 - 12 December 1939) was a Canadian Anglican bishop.

Gray was born in Kilburn, London and was educated at Chatham House Grammar School and the University of Manitoba. He was ordained in 1895 and was a curate at South Edmonton from 1895 to 1896 and its incumbent until 1897. He then became Rector of Edmonton from 1897 to 1914 the Archdeacon of Edmonton  from 1907. In 1914 he became the first Bishop of Edmonton, serving until 1931.
 
Gray died in Bungay in 1939.

References

1873 births
People from Kilburn, London
People educated at Chatham House Grammar School
University of Manitoba alumni
Anglican Church of Canada archdeacons
20th-century Anglican Church of Canada bishops
Anglican bishops of Edmonton
1939 deaths